Bais Godam is a small railway station in Jaipur district, Rajasthan. Its code is BSGD. It serves Civil Lines area of Jaipur city. The station consists of two platforms. The platforms are not well sheltered. It lacks many facilities including water and sanitation. The station is main used for loading and unloading goods. It also serves as a yard for coaches of long-distance trains running to and from Jaipur.

Passenger trains used to stop there until the 1990s. Now no passenger train is scheduled to stop there.

See also
 Durgapura railway station
 Gandhinagar Jaipur railway station
 Jaipur Junction railway station

References

Railway stations in Jaipur
Railway stations in Jaipur district
Jaipur railway division